⁹
Windows 93 (often stylised as WINDOWS93) is a website stylised to look and work as an operating system, often called a Web OS, and a parody of the Windows 9x series. It was developed and is managed by two French musicians and programmers who go by the handles jankenpopp and Zombectro. The site features several web applications which reference and feature Internet memes from the late 1990s and early 2000s.

History

Version 0 
Version 0 is an initial proof-of-concept build that jankenpopp gave to Zombectro. It features an interactive start menu and draggable icons.

Version 1 
Version 1 is the first release version, finished on November 1, 2014. It added more functionality to windows and the start menu, and introduced several apps (for a total of 38), including a fully-functional web browser.

Version 2 
Version 2 is the previous version of Windows 93, published on June 10, 2017. Version 2 added the A: drive which allows users to store files, run custom JavaScript and apply custom CSS from the browser's local storage. It introduced several more apps, including Trollbox, a web chat application; and Bindowzuchan, an imageboard (both of which are now discontinued).

Version 3 
Version 3 was announced on October 24, 2022, and fully released on February 14, 2023. As of November, an e-shop was opened, along with a letter from the developers and a roadmap of version 3.

Content 
Currently, Windows 93 Version 2 contains:

 76 applications (19 hidden ones)
 53 FX effects
 31 terminal commands (not including applications and JavaScript)
 4 joke viruses
 A joke antivirus
 8 games
 A downgrade, upgrade and shutdown system
 A realistically simulated hard drive
 A functioning browser with default websites and easter eggs

Popularity 
After its launch at the end of October 2014, Windows 93 went viral through social media, blogs and press mentions and served more than 4,000,000 users worldwide in two weeks.

Currently, Windows 93 receives about 110,000 visits per month.

See also 
 eyeOS
 ChromeOS
 Virtual Desktop Ubuntu
Kubntu

External links 
 
 Windows 93 Wiki
 Windows 93 Development Completed, Try It in Your Browser Right Here, Softpedia, March 6, 2015

References 

Websites